The Hunter-Bellevue School of Nursing (HBSON) is the nursing school of Hunter College, a public university that is a constituent organization of the City University of New York (CUNY).  It is located on the Brookdale Campus, at East 25th Street and 1st Avenue in Kips Bay, near Bellevue Hospital.  The school is the flagship nursing program for CUNY.

History 
The nation's first nursing school based on Florence Nightingale's principles, the Training School for Nurses, opened at Bellevue in 1873.   Sister Helen Bowdin of the All Saints Sisterhood in London was the first Superintendent.

In 1952, the administration of the Bellevue Schools of Nursing and the Bellevue Hospital Nursing Service was split for the first time with Associate Directors.  In 1954, the school moved to the new building that is Hunter-Bellevue's current location and enrolled in the National Student Nurses' Association.

In 1967, an agreement with Hunter College was reached to transfer the Bellevue facilities to Hunter.  In 1969, the final students in the diploma program were graduated.

Hunter began educating nurses in 1943 and admitted the first enrollees in the Basic Collegiate Nursing Program leading to a Bachelor of Science (Nursing) degree in 1955 and to the graduate program leading to a Master of Science (Nursing) in 1961.

The Hunter College Department of Nursing then expanded and moved to the facilities of the Bellevue Hospital School of Nursing in 1969 as the latter program was absorbed by Hunter Department of Nursing.  From June 1974 until it became independent again in 2008, Hunter-Bellevue Nursing School was part of the Division of the Schools of the Health Professions of Hunter College.

In September 2012, plans were announced for a new campus for HBSON at 525 East 73rd Street in Manhattan near the main Hunter campus.

Academic programs

Undergraduate programs 
Bachelor of Science in Nursing
 Generic
 RN to BSN
 Accelerated Second-Degree

Graduate programs 
The Master of Science in Nursing degree is offered in the following areas:
 Adult Health Nursing/Clinical Nurse Specialist
 Clinical Nurse Leader
 Community/Public Health Nursing
 Community/Public Health Nursing/Urban Public Health (MS/MPH)
 Gerontological/Adult Nurse Practitioner
 Nursing Administration/Public Administration
 Psychiatric Mental Health Nursing/Nurse Practitioner

Post-Master's Certificates 

Psychiatric Nurse Practitioner Advanced Certificate Program
Advanced Certificate in Nursing Education

Doctorate in Nursing 
The Doctor of Nursing Practice degree is offered in the following areas:
 Adult/Gerontological NP DNP
 Psychiatric/Mental Health NP DNP
 Family Nurse NP DNP, open only to post-Master's applicants
 Community/Public Health Nursing DNP
 A research doctorate in nursing (DNS) is offered through the CUNY Graduate Center.

Accreditation 
The Hunter-Bellevue School of Nursing baccalaureate, master's, post-graduate certificate, and Doctor of Nursing Practice (DNP) programs are accredited by the Commission on Collegiate Nursing Education (CCNE).

Organizations 
The Alpha Phi Chapter at Hunter-Bellevue is the 43rd chapter of the Sigma Theta Tau International honor society of nursing, chartered in 1970.

The Hunter Student Nurses' Association is a chapter of the Nursing Students’ Association of New York which is a member of the National Student Nurses' Association.

Ranking 
The graduate nursing program was ranked #61 for 2015 by the U.S. News Best Grad School Rankings.

In 2014, the passing rate for Hunter-Bellevue graduates taking the NCLEX RN was 103 of 123 or 83.7%.

References 

Hunter College
Nursing schools in New York City
Educational institutions established in 1873
1873 establishments in New York (state)
Kips Bay, Manhattan